The Memphis Street Railway Company was a privately owned operator of streetcars (trams) and trolleybuses in Memphis, Tennessee on roughly 160 route miles of overhead electrified cable and rails between 1895 and 1960. The longest of the rail lines reached from downtown to Memphis National Cemetery near Raleigh.

History 
The Memphis Street Railway was created in March 1895 through the merger of several smaller systems including the Memphis & Raleigh Springs Railroad, East End Street Railway, Citizens Street Railroad and City & Suburban Railway. In 1890, when The  Citizens Street Railroad of Memphis, Tenn., suffered a financial setback, Mr. Albert Merritt Billings of Chicago, bought the company for over $2,000,000. Billings placed electric power on the roads and the company became a great success. Billings recruited Mr. Frank G. Jones from Iowa to operate the company as vice-president. At its peak the interurban operated nearly 77 miles of trackage, 51 one of which was double-track. Service lasted until the 1940s when operations were abandoned in favor of buses.

Service 
Memphis, then only 44 square miles (smaller than San Francisco), could be traversed easily with frequent service to within blocks of any corner in the city. Fares included a free transfer.

Lines of Memphis Street Railway Co. 
1 Normal
2 Fair Grounds
3 Raleigh-Macon Road
6 Lamar [trolleybus]
7 Crosstown
8 Elmwood
9 Glenview
11 Wellington
12 Florida
14 Second-Desoto Park
15 Jackson
16 Lane-Faxon
17 Forest-Hill
19 Walker Av

Transition 
Streetcars remained in use until 1947 when electric trolleybuses (trackless trolleys) were phased in fully. Trolleybuses were discontinued in use for diesel buses by 1960. In 1961, The City of Memphis Transit Authority, the agency that would later become MATA in 1975, took over and became publicly owned.

Lawsuits 
African Americans successfully sued the Memphis Street Railway Company for personal injury and racial insult. African American working-class men and women were often financially compensated for physical injuries, while African American middle-class women won their lawsuits against white conductors who insulted their personal dignity.

Today 
The formerly major intersection at Main St and Madison Ave of the Main St and Fair Grounds lines are returned to service by the now-public descendant agency’s Main Street and Madison Avenue Trolleys.

References

Transportation in Memphis, Tennessee